Babacar N'Diaye (born 12 December 1973) is a Senegalese footballer who played as a forward.

Career
N'Diaye was born in Thiès, Senegal. He spent two seasons in the Bundesliga with Hannover 96.

Coaching career
On 1 July 2009, he signed a contract as player-manager with  TSV Havelse.

Personal life
N'Diaye also holds German citizenship.

References

External links
 
 

Living people
1973 births
Association football forwards
Senegalese footballers
US Rail players
1. FC Union Solingen players
Wuppertaler SV players
Hannover 96 players
SpVgg Unterhaching players
FC Carl Zeiss Jena players
SC Verl players
SV Babelsberg 03 players
Türkiyemspor Berlin players
TSV Havelse players
SC Preußen Münster players
Bundesliga players
2. Bundesliga players
3. Liga players
Sportspeople from Thiès